Saelices el Chico is a municipality located in the province of Salamanca, Castile and León, Spain. As of 2016 the municipality has a population of 152 inhabitants.

See also
List of municipalities in Salamanca

References

Municipalities in the Province of Salamanca